LaVerne Janet Jones-Ferrette (born September 16, 1981) is a sprinter from the United States Virgin Islands who specializes in the 100 and 200 meters. She represented her country at the Summer Olympics in 2004, 2008 and 2012. She won the silver medal over 60 meters at the 2010 IAAF World Indoor Championships in a time of 6.97 seconds; a subsequent drug test revealed a banned substance in her system and she was stripped of her medal.

Jones-Ferrette competed at the World Championships in Athletics in 2005, 2007 and 2009, but did not reach an event final on any of those occasions. Her first international medal came at the 2006 Central American and Caribbean Games, where she was the 100 m silver medalist. She represented her country at the 2007 Pan American Games. She holds all the US Virgin Islands records for the sprint events from 60 to 400 meters.

Career
She grew up on Saint Croix and later moved to the United States on an athletic scholarship. She attended Barton County Community College and was coached by Lance Brauman, who also coached Tyson Gay and Veronica Campbell. She attended the University of Oklahoma and represented the Oklahoma Sooners in the NCAA Championships before graduating in 2003. She made her Olympic debut at the 2004 Athens Olympics, reaching the second round in both the 100 m and 200 m. She was one of only two athletes from the country to compete in the athletics competition that year (alongside ) and was chosen to be the 2004 Olympic flag bearer for the US Virgin Islands.

She came fourth in the 100 m at the 2005 CAC Championships and ran at the 2005 World Championships in Athletics later that season, reaching the semi-finals of the 200 m. She also reached the semi-final stage of the 60 m at the 2006 IAAF World Indoor Championships. At the 2006 Central American and Caribbean Games she entered both the 100 m and 200 m – she just missed out on a medal in the 200 m, finishing fourth, but was the runner-up in the 100 m, taking the silver medal behind Tahesia Harrigan. In 2007, she competed at the Pan American Games for the first time and was seventh in the women's 100 m final. She reached the 200 m semis for a second time running at the World Championships in Osaka.

Jones-Ferrette represented the US Virgin Islands at the 2008 Summer Olympics in Beijing competing at the 100 metres sprint. In her first round heat she placed third behind Kerron Stewart and Ezinne Okparaebo in a time of 11.41 to advance to the second round. There she failed to qualify for the semi finals as her time of 11.55 was only the fifth time of her heat, causing elimination.

She further improved her 100 and 200 meter national records at the Grande Prêmio Brasil Caixa meeting in May 2009. Breaking both records in just over an hour, she ran 11.18 in the 100 m and 22.49 seconds in the 200 m. She competed at the 2009 World Championships in Athletics but she just missed out on making the 200 metres final. She ended the year with seventh-place finishes in the sprints at the 2009 IAAF World Athletics Final.

Jones-Ferrette made a strong start to 2010, building up to the 2010 IAAF World Indoor Championships by running the fastest 60 m time recorded in eleven years. Her time of 6.97 seconds made her the sixth fastest woman over the distance and even she was surprised to have run such a quick time. An absence from competition that summer was later explained when she announced that she and her husband, Stephen Ferrette, were expecting a child. However, on December 16, 2010, it was made public that she was banned from competition for 6 months from April to October of the same year due to a positive test of a banned substance, as well as had her world indoor medal stripped. She stated though that the substance was used to help her fertility.

She competed at the 2012 Summer Olympics, finishing in 9th in the 200 m and in 14th in the 100 m, not qualifying for either final.

Competition record

Personal bests 
 60 meters - 6.97 s (2010) - national record.
 100 meters - 11.07 s (2012) - national record.
 200 meters - 22.46 s (2009) - national record.
 400 meters - 51.47 s (2007) - national record.

References

External links 
 
 Tilastopaja biography

1981 births
Living people
United States Virgin Islands female sprinters
Doping cases in athletics
United States Virgin Islands sportspeople in doping cases
Olympic track and field athletes of the United States Virgin Islands
Athletes (track and field) at the 2004 Summer Olympics
Athletes (track and field) at the 2008 Summer Olympics
Athletes (track and field) at the 2012 Summer Olympics
Athletes (track and field) at the 2016 Summer Olympics
Pan American Games competitors for the United States Virgin Islands
Athletes (track and field) at the 2007 Pan American Games
Athletes (track and field) at the 2011 Pan American Games
World Athletics Championships athletes for the United States Virgin Islands
Oklahoma Sooners women's track and field athletes
Barton Cougars women's track and field athletes
People from Saint Croix, U.S. Virgin Islands
Athletes (track and field) at the 2015 Pan American Games
Central American and Caribbean Games silver medalists for the United States Virgin Islands
Competitors at the 2006 Central American and Caribbean Games
Central American and Caribbean Games medalists in athletics
Olympic female sprinters